Forsteriola is a genus of African araneomorph spiders in the family Anapidae, first described by Paolo Brignoli in 1981.  it contains only two species.

References

Anapidae
Araneomorphae genera
Spiders of Africa
Taxa named by Paolo Brignoli